Shelley's sunbird (Cinnyris shelleyi) is a species of bird in the family Nectariniidae.  It is found in Democratic Republic of the Congo, Malawi, Mozambique, Tanzania, Zambia and Zimbabwe. The species is named after George Ernest Shelley, an English geologist and ornithologist and nephew of poet Percy Bysshe Shelley.

The subspecies C. s. hofmanni has been recognized by the International Ornithological Congress (IOC) as a separate species, Hofmann's sunbird.

References

 BirdLife International 2004.  Nectarinia shelleyi.   2006 IUCN Red List of Threatened Species.   Downloaded on 26 July 2007.
 

Shelley's sunbird
Birds of East Africa
Shelley's sunbird
Taxonomy articles created by Polbot